Sivananda Colony is a neighborhood and suburb in Coimbatore, India. Sivanandha colony shares its border with Tatabad, R. S. Puram, Rathinapuri and Goundampalayam.

Neighbourhoods in Coimbatore